The 1990s brought a growing international awareness of Irish traditional music, along with a period of economic success for Ireland (the "Celtic Tiger") and the launch of the music-and-dance show Riverdance. In America, the 1991 television series Bringing It All Back Home, produced by Philip King, focussed on the Irish roots of much American music, and was followed by other TV productions also themed around Irish music.

As Irish music became more widely performed and increasingly commercialised, debates arose over issues of "purity" in Irish music in the face of diversifying settings and uses, and also over intellectual property inhering in compositions and recordings in the genre.

Births and deaths

Births
 Fintan Warfield, born 1992
 SOAK, born 1996

Deaths
 Tom Clancy, died 1990
 Tom Lenihan, died 1990
 Sean McCarthy, died 1990
 Josie McDermott, died 1992
 Paddy Murphy, died 1992
 Micho Russell, died 1994
 Nioclás Tóibín, died 1994
 Liam Weldon, died 1995
 Seán 'ac Dhonncha, died 1996
 Jimmy Ferguson, died 1997
 Paddy Clancy, died 1998
 Eithne Ní Uallacháin, died 1999

Recordings
 1990: The Red Crow, by Altan
 1991: Bringing It All Back Home, by Gerry O'Connor
The Song of the Singing Horseman, by Jimmy MacCarthy
Essential Pogues, by The Pogues
 1992: 30 Years A-Greying, by The Dubliners
 1993: All in Good Time, by Patrick Street
 1994: Banba, by Clannad
Someone to Dance With, by Sonny Condell
A Stór Is A Stóirín, by Pádraigín Ní Uallacháin
 1995: Dirty Rotten Shame, by Ronnie Drew
Coming Days, by Ron Kavana
 1996: Flame, by Johnny Duhan
Graffiti Tongue, by Christy Moore
Aoife, by Aoife Ní Fhearraigh
 1997: Talk On Corners, by The Corrs
 1998: Fire in the Kitchen, by The Chieftains
1798 – The First Year of Liberty, by Frank Harte and Dónal Lunny
 1999: The Morning Mist, by Joe Burke
Otherworld, by Lúnasa
Back on Top, by Van Morrison

References

1990